Norman Leonard Spencer (21 August 1902 – 26 February 1966) was born in Howard Township, Ontario.  He was a Progressive Conservative party member of the House of Commons of Canada.

He was first elected at the Essex West riding in the 1958 general election after an unsuccessful attempt there in the 1957 election. Spencer was re-elected for a second term in the 1958 election but was defeated by Herb Gray of the Liberal Party in the 1962 election.

References

External links
 

1902 births
1966 deaths
Members of the House of Commons of Canada from Ontario
People from Chatham-Kent
Progressive Conservative Party of Canada MPs
Lawyers in Ontario